The Two Girls (French: Les deux gamines) is a 1951 French drama film directed by Maurice de Canonge and starring Léo Marjane, Suzy Prim and Jean-Jacques Delbo. The same story had previously been made into a 1921 silent film of the same title and a 1936 sound film.

The film's sets were designed by the art director Claude Bouxin. It was shot at the Billancourt Studios in Paris.

Synopsis
After it is believed that their mother has been killed in a plane crash, two girls are sent to live with their kindly grandfather but are mistreated by their governess.

Cast

References

Bibliography 
 James L. Limbacher. Haven't I seen you somewhere before?: Remakes, sequels, and series in motion pictures and television, 1896-1978. Pierian Press, 1979.

External links 
 

1951 films
1951 drama films
French drama films
1950s French-language films
Films directed by Maurice de Canonge
Remakes of French films
Films shot at Billancourt Studios
Films scored by Maurice Yvain
French black-and-white films
1950s French films